The 1973 Princeton Tigers football team was an American football team that represented Princeton University during the 1973 NCAA Division I football season. Princeton finished last in the Ivy League.

In their first year under head coach Robert Casciola, the Tigers compiled a 1–8 record and was outscored 233 to 127. William G. Cronin was the team captain.

Princeton's winless (0–7) conference record placed last in the Ivy League standings. The Tigers were outscored 173 to 76 by Ivy opponents. 

Princeton played its home games at Palmer Stadium on the university campus in Princeton, New Jersey.

Schedule

References

Princeton
Princeton Tigers football seasons
Princeton Tigers football